Whitening, Whitener or Whiten may refer to:

Processes or techniques
 Cloud whitening, a proposed solar radiation management climate engineering technique
 Key whitening, increasing the security of a cryptographic cipher
 Racial whitening, an ideology in Brazil 1889–1914 
 Blanqueamiento, the practice of marrying whiter people in order to have whiter offspring
 Signal whitening, decorrelation in signal processing
 Skin whitening, using chemical substances to lighten the skin
 Software whitening, an approach to coping with bias in random number generation
 Tooth whitening, in dentistry
 Whitening (leather processing), a leather production process
 Whitening transformation, in mathematics

People
 Andrew Whiten (born 1948), a British zoologist and psychologist
 Colette Whiten (born 1945), Canadian sculptor and artist
 Mark Whiten (born 1966), American baseball player
 Tim Whiten (born 1941), an American-born Canadian artist
 Basil Lee Whitener (1915–1989), an American politician
 Catherine Evans Whitener (1880–1964), a textile artisan in Georgia, US
 Gordon Whitener, founder, chairman, and CEO of The Whitener Company, a Tennessee-based consulting and investment firm
 Helen Whitener (born 1964/1965), a Trinidadian-American attorney and jurist
 Paul Whitener (1911–1959), an American landscape painter and museum director
 Todd Whitener (born 1978), an American musician

Other uses
 Corrective fluid, a white fluid applied to paper to mask errors in text
 Non-dairy creamer, commonly called tea whitener or coffee whitener
 Optical brightener, an additive used to enhance the appearance of colour of fabric and paper
 Stress-whitening, where a white line appears when a material is stressed by bending or punching

See also

 Albicans (disambiguation)
 Whitten (disambiguation)
Whiten v Pilot Insurance Co, 2002 Supreme Court of Canada case